Frank "Golden Boy" Johnson (27 November 1928 – 7 June 1970) born in Manchester was an English professional feather/light/welter/middleweight boxer of the 1940s and 1950s who won the British Boxing Board of Control (BBBofC) Central Area lightweight title, BBBofC British lightweight title, and British Empire lightweight title, and was a challenger for the British Empire lightweight title against Pat Ford, and BBBofC British welterweight title against Peter Waterman his professional fighting weight varied from , i.e. featherweight to , i.e. middleweight. Frank Johnson was trained and managed by Jack Bates, and promoted by Jack Solomons.

Genealogical information

Frank Johnson (born Frank Williamson, but adopted the surname Johnson, from notable Manchester boxer Len Johnson) was the younger brother of Rita L. Williamson (birth registered January→March 1922 in Southport), and the 1942 Amateur Boxing Association of England (ABAE) Junior Class-A flyweight champion, boxing out of Manchester County ABC, 1945 Amateur Boxing Association of England (ABAE) lightweight champion, boxing out of Manchester YMCA ABC and BBBofC Central Area welterweight champion boxer Jackie Braddock (birth registered July→September 1927 in Manchester North, born John 'Jackie' Williamson, but adopted the surname Braddock, from world heavyweight champion boxer James J. Braddock), and was the older brother of Hilda Williamson (birth registered January→March 1930 in Manchester South).

Death
Frank Johnson died in June 1970, aged 41, and was buried in Southern Cemetery, Manchester.

References

External links

Image - Frank Johnson (centre) with Jack Solomons (right), and Tommy Trinder (rightmost).
Article - Frank Johnson – British Lightweight Champion 1952-1955
Video - Waterman Keeps Title 1956
Frank Johnson Book & e-book  

1928 births
1970 deaths
English male boxers
Featherweight boxers
Lightweight boxers
Middleweight boxers
People from Withington
Place of death missing
Boxers from Manchester
Welterweight boxers
Burials at Southern Cemetery, Manchester